In 1951-52 the South Africa national rugby union team toured England, France, Ireland, Scotland, and Wales, playing a series of test matches, as well as games against club, regional, and representative teams. South Africa accomplished their third Grand Slam by winning all four tests against the Home Nations sides, and also won the test match against France. This was the sixth South Africa tour and the fourth tour of the Northern Hemisphere. It was also the first time the South Africans played the invitational British Barbarian team.

The tour was the most successful the South African team had undertaken; the team only lost a single match. In the tests played the team beat all four Home Nations, France and the Barbarians. The only team to beat the Springboks was the invitational London Counties team. The final tour record saw 31 matches played, with South Africa winning 30 and losing just the one game.

Touring party

Management

Managers: F.W. Mellish, Danie Craven
Captain: Basil Kenyon

Full backs

Johnny Buchler (Transvaal)
Jakkals Keevy (Eastern Transavaal)

Three-quarters

Paul Johnstone (Western Province)
Tjol Lategan (Western Province)
Buks Marais (Boland)
Chum Ochse (Western Province)
Cowboy Saunders (Border)
Ryk van Schoor (Rhodesia)
Des Sinclair (Transvaal)
Basie Vivier (Orange Free State)

Half backs

Hannes Brewis (Northern Transvaal)
Dennis Fry (Western Province)
J.S. Oelofse (Transvaal)
P. A. du Toit (Northern Transvaal)

Forwards

W.H.M. Barnard (Griqualand West)
H.J. Becker (Northern Transvaal)
G. Dannhauser (Transvaal)
W.H. Delport (Eastern Province)
Ernst Dinkelmann (Northern Transvaal)
Stephen Fry (Western Province)
Okey Geffin (Transvaal)
Basil Kenyon (Border) capt.
A.C. Koch (Boland)
Hennie Muller (Transvaal)
B. Myburgh (Eastern Transvaal)
Jan Pickard (Western Province)
Salty du Rand (Rhodesia)
F.E.B. van der Ryst (Transvaal)
P.W. Wessels (Orange Free State)
C.J. van Wyk (Transvaal)

Results

The matches

Cardiff

Cardiff: Frank Trott, Haydn Morris, Bleddyn Williams, Jack Matthews (capt.), Alun Thomas, Cliff Morgan, Rex Willis, Arthur Hull, Geoff Beckingham, Cliff Davies, Bill Tamplin, Malcolm Collins, Sid Judd, Des O'Brien, CD Williams

South Africa: JU Buchler, MJ Saunders, MT Lategan, RA van Schoor, JK Ochse, JD Brewis, JS Oelofse, HJ Bekker, PW Wessels, AC Kosh, SP Fry, WHM Barnard, E Dinkelmann, CJ van Wyk, HSV Muller

Scotland

Scotland: Dod Burrell, John Hart, Donald Scott, Oliver Turnbull, David Rose, Angus Cameron (capt), Arthur Dorward, Hamish Dawson, John Macphail, Bob Wilson, James Johnston, Hamish Inglis, Doug Elliot, Bob Taylor, Peter Kininmonth

South Africa: Johnny Buchler, Buks Marais, Tjol Lategan, Ryk van Schoor, Paul Johnstone, Hannes Brewis, Fonnie du Toit, Chris Koch, Willa Delport, Okey Geffin, Salty du Rand, Ernst Dinkelmann, Basie van Wyk, Stephen Fry, Hennie Muller (capt)

Ireland

Ireland:  John Murphy, William McKee, Noel Henderson, Antony Browne, Mick Lane, Jackie Kyle, John O'Meara, Tom Clifford, Karl Mullen, John Hartley Smith, Patrick Lawlor, Robin Thompson, Bill McKay, Jim McCarthy, Des O'Brien (capt)

South Africa: JU Buchler, PG Johnstone, RA van Schoor, MT Lategan, JK Ochse, JD Brewis, E Dinkelmann, A Geffin, WH Delport, AC Kosh, SP Fry, WHM Barnard, JD du Rand, CJ van Wyk, HSV Muller

Wales

Wales: Gerwyn Williams (Llanelli), Ken Jones (Newport), Malcolm Thomas (Newport), Bleddyn Williams (Cardiff), Lewis Jones (Llanelli), Cliff Morgan (Cardiff), Rex Willis (Cardiff), Billy Williams (Swansea), Dai Davies (Somerset Police), Don Hayward (Newbridge), Rees Stephens (Neath), Roy John (Neath), Len Blyth (Swansea), John Gwilliam (Edinburgh Wanderers) (capt.), Allen Forward (Pontypool)

South Africa: JU Buchler, PG Johnstone, RA van Schoor, MT Lategan, JK Ochse, JD Brewis, PA du Toit, A Geffin, WH Delport, AC Kosh, SP Fry, WHM Barnard, JD du Rand, CJ van Wyk, HSV Muller

England

England: William Hook, Ted Woodward, Albert Agar, Lewis Cannell, Chris Winn, Nim Hall (capt), Gordon Rimmer, Wally Holmes, Eric Evans, Bob Stirling, John Matthews, Squire Wilkins, Don White, Alec Lewis, John Kendall-Carpenter

South Africa: Johnny Buchler, Paul Johnstone, Tjol Lategan, Ryk van Schoor, Chum Ochse, Hannes Brewis, Fonnie du Toit, Chris Koch, Willa Delport, Jaap Bekker, Salty du Rand, Ernst Dinkelmann, Basie van Wyk, Stephen Fry, Hennie Muller (capt)

Barbarians

Barbarians: Gerwyn Williams (Llanelli), Ken Jones (Newport), Bleddyn Williams (Cardiff), LB Cannell (St. Mary's Hospital), Ted Woodward (Wasps), Cliff Morgan (Cardiff), Rex Willis (Cardiff), John Kendall-Carpenter (Penzance), Dai Davies (Somerset Police), RV Stirling (RAF), Rees Stephens (Neath), Roy John (Neath), Doug Elliot (Edinburgh Academicals), JE Nelson (Malone) (capt.), VG Roberts(Harlequins)

South Africa: AC Keevy, PG Johnstone, RA van Schoor, FP Marais, JK Ochse, MT Lategan, PA du Toit, HJ Bekker, WH Delport, FEB van der Ryst, SP Fry, E Dinkelmann, JM du Rand, CJ van Wyk, HSV Muller

France

France:  Pierre Guilleux, Georges Brun, Jacques Mauran, Maurice Prat, Jean Colombier, Georges Carabignac, Gerard Dufau, Rene Bienes, Paul Labadie, Rene Brejassou, Lucien Mias, Bernard Chevallier, Jean Prat, Jean-Roger Bourdeu, Guy Basquet (capt)

South Africa:

Bibliography

References

South Africa tour
South Africa tour
South Africa national rugby team tours of Europe
Rugby union tours of England
Rugby union tours of Ireland
Rugby union tours of Scotland
Rugby union tours of Wales
Rugby union tours of France
1951 in South African rugby union
1952 in South African rugby union
tour
tour
tour
tour
tour